Antonín Vodička (1 March 1907 – 9 August 1975) was a Czech football player.

He played club football for SK Slavia Praha.

He played 18 matches for the Czechoslovakia national team and was a participant at the 1934 FIFA World Cup.

References 
 Profile at ČMFS website

1907 births
1975 deaths
Czech footballers
Czechoslovak footballers
1934 FIFA World Cup players
SK Slavia Prague players
Czechoslovakia international footballers
Footballers from Prague
Association football midfielders
People from the Kingdom of Bohemia